Kiwaia pharetria is a species of moth in the family Gelechiidae. It was described by Edward Meyrick in 1885. It is endemic to New Zealand.

The wingspan is 13–17 mm. The forewings are whitish-ochreous, obscurely irrorated with brownish-ochreous, tending to form streaks on the veins, sometimes a more distinct apical streak and sometimes a few scattered black scales, also tending to accumulate on the veins. There are three small black discal spots, sometimes almost obsolete, the first before the middle, the second on the fold obliquely before the first and the third beyond the middle. The apical portion of the costa and hindmargin are obscurely dotted with black. The hindwings are whitish-grey.

Larvae feed on Carmichaelia species.

References

Kiwaia
Moths described in 1886
Moths of New Zealand
Endemic fauna of New Zealand
Taxa named by Edward Meyrick
Endemic moths of New Zealand